Holiday House is a hamlet located in the Town of Forestport in Oneida County, New York. Holiday House is located by Long Lake.

References

Hamlets in Oneida County, New York
Hamlets in New York (state)